His Only Father is a 1919 American short comedy film directed by Hal Roach and Frank Terry, and starring Harold Lloyd. This was the last one-reel short Lloyd worked on before going onto two reelers with his next film "Bumping Into Broadway". This film is believed to be lost.

Cast
 Harold Lloyd 
 Snub Pollard 
 Bebe Daniels  
 Sammy Brooks
 Lige Conley (as Lige Cromley)
 Frank Daniels
 Charles Inslee
 Mark Jones
 Dee Lampton
 Gus Leonard
 Marie Mosquini
 Fred C. Newmeyer (as Fred Newmeyer)
 H.L. O'Connor
 Charles Stevenson (as Charles E. Stevenson)
 Noah Young

See also
 Harold Lloyd filmography
 List of lost films

References

External links

1919 films
1919 comedy films
1919 short films
American silent short films
American black-and-white films
Films directed by Hal Roach
Lost American films
Silent American comedy films
Films with screenplays by H. M. Walker
American comedy short films
1919 lost films
Lost comedy films
1910s American films